Tapur village is located in Chauth ka Barwara tehsil of Sawai Madhopur district, Rajasthan, India.

References

Villages in Sawai Madhopur district